Ordensburg (plural Ordensburgen) is a German term meaning "castles/fortresses of (military) orders", and is used specifically for such fortified structures built by crusading German military orders during the Middle Ages.

Medieval Ordensburgen
The Ordensburgs were originally constructed by the Livonian Brothers of the Sword and later the Teutonic Knights to fortify territory in Prussia and Livonia captured from the native populations - Old Prussians, Lithuanians and native peoples of what is now Latvia and Estonia. Later, Ordensburgs were used to attack Lithuania. Since they were built and used by religious military orders, the Ordensburgs often resembled cloisters. While they were considerably larger than those in the Holy Roman Empire, they were much scarcer in the Monastic state of the Teutonic Knights. While a normal castle in the Reich would control about 38 km2, a castle would control 370 km2 in Prussia and 789 km2 in Livonia, Courland and Estonia. The few small castles are considered to be of vassals, while the larger ones might have served as arsenals and strongholds during the Northern Crusades and were purpose-built to colonize the respective countries and peoples by capturing (and holding) territory.

Most Ordensburgs were rectangular, even quadratic in form, built from red brick and lacking a Bergfried. Many castles had no towers at all, as the bailey, a mighty quadrangle, was considered sufficient for defence.

List of medieval Ordensburgen 

Adsel (Gaujiena, Latvia) - a genuine order castle, seat of a commandery
Allenstein (Olsztyn, Poland)
Alschwangen (Alsunga, Latvia) - a genuine order castle
Altona (Altene, Latvia)
Angern (Angerja, Estonia) - vassal castle
Angerburg (Węgorzewo, Poland)
Arensburg (Kuressaare, Estonia) - bishop castle
Arrasch (Āraiši, Latvia)
Ascheraden (Aizkraukle, Latvia) - a genuine order castle, seat of a commandery
Ass (Kiltsi, Estonia) - vassal castle
Bäslack (Bezławki, Poland)
Balga (Balga, Kaliningrad Oblast, Russia)
Barten (Barciany, Poland)
Bauske (Bauska, Latvia) - a genuine order castle, seat of a bailiff
Bebern
Berson (Bērzaune, Latvia)
Birgelau (Bierzgłowo, Poland)
Borkholm (Porkuni, Estonia) - bishop castle
Brandenburg (Ushakovo, Kaliningrad Oblast, Russia)
Burtneck (Burtnieki, Latvia) - a genuine order castle, seat of lower officials
Bütow (Bytów, Poland)
Caymen (Zarechye, Kaliningrad Oblast, Russia)
Danzig (Gdańsk, Poland)
Dibau (Podgórz, Poland)
Doblen (Dobele, Latvia) - a genuine order castle, seat of a commandery
Domnau (Domnovo, Kaliningrad Oblast, Russia)
Dondangen (Dundaga, Latvia) - a bishop castle
Dorpat (Tartu, Estonia) - bishop castle
Dünaburg (Daugavpils, Latvia) - a genuine order castle, seat of a commandery
Dünamünde (Daugavgrīva, Latvia) - a genuine order castle, seat of a commandery
Durben (Durbe, Latvia)
Eckersburg (Okartowo, Poland)
Edwahlen (Ēdole, Latvia) - a bishop castle
Engelsburg (Pokrzywno, Poland)
Elbing (Elbląg, Poland)
Erlaa (Ērgļi, Latvia)
Ermes (Ērģeme, Latvia)
Falkenau (Kärkna, Estonia) - monastery
Fellin (Viljandi, Estonia) - a genuine order castle, seat of a commandery
Fickel (Vigala, Estonia) - vassal castle
Georgenburg (Mayovka, Kaliningrad Oblast, Russia)
Goldingen (Kuldīga, Latvia)
Gollub (Golub-Dobrzyń, Poland)
Graudenz (Grudziądz, Poland)
Grobin (Grobiņa, Latvia) - a genuine order castle, seat of a bailiff
Groß Roop (Lielstraupe, Latvia) - a bishop castle
Hapsal (Haapsalu, Estonia) - bishop castle
Hasenpoth (Aizpute, Latvia)
Heilsberg (Lidzbark Warmiński, Poland)
Helmat (Helme, Estonia) - a genuine order castle
Hochrosen (Augstroze, Latvia)
Hofzumberg (Tērvete, Latvia)
Holme (Mārtiņsala, Latvia)
Insterburg (Chernyakhovsk, Kaliningrad Oblast, Russia)
Jaschnitz (Nowy Jasiniec, Poland)
Johannisburg (Pisz, Poland)
Kalzenau (Kalsnava, Latvia)
Kandau (Kandava, Latvia)
Karkus (Karksi, Estonia) - a genuine order castle, seat of a bailiff
Kirrumpäh (Kirumpää, Estonia) - bishop castle
Königsberg (Kaliningrad, Kaliningrad Oblast, Russia) - a genuine order castle, seat of Grand Master
Kokenhusen (Koknese, Latvia) - a bishop castle
Kremon (Krimulda, Latvia) - a bishop castle
Kyda (Kiiu, Estonia) - vassal castle
Labiau (Polessk, Kaliningrad Oblast, Russia)
Lais (Laiuse, Estonia) - a genuine order castle
Lamgraben (Grabno, Poland)
Leal (Lihula, Estonia) - built and held jointly by order and bishop
Lemsal (Limbaži, Latvia)
Leipe (Lipienek, Poland)
Lennewarden (Lielvārde, Latvia) - a bishop castle
Lochstädt (Baltiysk, Kaliningrad Oblast, Russia)
Loxten (Lokstene, Latvia)
Ludsen (Ludza, Latvia) - a genuine order castle
Lyck (Ełk, Poland)
Marienburg (Alūksne, Latvia) - a genuine order castle, seat of a commandery
Marienburg (Malbork, Poland) - a genuine order castle, seat of Grand Master
Marienwerder (Kwidzyn, Poland)
Mehlsack (Pieniężno, Poland)
Memel (Klaipėda, Lithuania) - a genuine order castle
Mewe (Gniew, Poland)
Mohrungen (Morąg, Poland)
Mojahn (Mujāni, Latvia)
Narwa (Narva, Estonia) - a genuine order castle, seat of a bailiff
Neidenburg (Nidzica, Poland)
Nessau (Nieszawa, Poland)
Neuenburg (Jaunpils, Latvia) - a genuine order castle
Neuermühlen (Ādaži, Latvia)
Neuhausen (Guryevsk, Kaliningrad Oblast, Russia)
Neuhausen (Valtaiķi, Latvia)
Neuhausen (Vastseliina, Estonia) - bishop castle
Neu Kirchholm (Salaspils, Latvia)
Neuschloß (Vasknarva, Estonia) - a genuine order castle, seat of a bailiff
Oberpahlen (Põltsamaa, Estonia) - a genuine order castle, seat of bailiff
Odenpäh (Otepää, Estonia) - bishop castle
Ortelsburg (Szczytno, Poland)
Ossiek (Osiek, Poland)
Osterode (Ostróda, Poland)
Padis (Padise, Estonia) - monastery
Papau (Papowo Biskupie, Poland)
Pernau (Pärnu, Estonia) - a genuine order castle, seat of bailiff
Peude (Pöide, Estonia) - a genuine order castle, seat of bailiff
Pilten (Piltene, Latvia)
Pöddes (Kalvi, Estonia) - vassal castle
Preußisch Holland (Pasłęk, Poland)
Preußisch Mark (Przezmark, Poland)
Ragnit (Neman, Kaliningrad Oblast, Russia)
Rastenburg (Kętrzyn, Poland)
Reval (Tallinn, Estonia) - a genuine order castle, seat of a commandery
Rheden (Radzyń Chełmiński, Poland)
Rhein (Ryn, Poland)
Riesenburg (Prabuty, Poland)
Riga (Riga, Latvia) - a genuine order castle, seat of Grand Master
Rössel (Reszel, Poland)
Rodenpois (Ropaži, Latvia)
Roggenhausen (Rogóźno-Zamek, Poland)
Ronneburg (Rauna, Latvia) - a bishop castle
Rosenberck (Susz, Poland)
Rositten (Rēzekne, Latvia) - a genuine order castle, seat of a bailiff
Rujen (Rūjiena, Latvia)
Saalau (Żuława, Poland)
Salis (Salacgrīva, Latvia) - a bishop castle
Schaaken (Nekrasovo, Kaliningrad Oblast, Russia)
Schlochau (Człuchów, Poland)
Schönberg (Skaistkalne, Latvia)
Schönsee (Kowalewo Pomorskie, Poland)
Schwanenburg (Gulbene, Latvia)
Schwetz (Świecie, Poland)
Seehesten (Szestno, Poland)
Segewold (Sigulda, Latvia) - a genuine order castle, seat of Land Marshal
Selburg (near modern Vecsēlpils, Latvia) - a genuine order castle, seat of a bailiff
Sesswangen (Cesvaine, Latvia)
Smilten (Smiltene, Latvia)
Soldau (Działdowo, Poland)
Sonnenburg (Maasi, Estonia) - a genuine order castle, seat of a bailiff
Straßburg (Brodnica, Poland)
Stuhm (Sztum, Poland)
Tapiau (Gvardeysk, Kaliningrad Oblast, Russia)
Taplaken (Talpaki, Kaliningrad Oblast, Russia)
Tarwast (Tarvastu, Estonia) - a genuine order castle
Terweten (Tērvete, Latvia)
Tolsburg (Toolse, Estonia) - a genuine order castle, seat of a bailiff
Thorn (Toruń, Poland) - a genuine order castle, seat of a commandery
Treyden (Turaida, Latvia) - a bishop castle
Trikaten (Trikāta, Latvia)
Tuchel (Tuchola, Poland)
Tuckum (Tukums, Latvia)
Türpsal (Järve, Estonia) - vassal castle
Uexküll (Ikšķile, Latvia)
Villack (Viļaka, Latvia) - a bishop castle
Wack (Vao, Estonia) - vassal castle
Waldau (Nizovye, Kaliningrad Oblast, Russia)
Warbeck (Uue-Kastre, Estonia) - bishop castle
Weißenstein (Paide, Estonia) - a genuine order castle, seat of a bailiff
Welsas (Wieldządz, Poland)
Wenden (Cēsis, Latvia) - a genuine order castle, seat of Grand Master
Werder (Virtsu, Estonia) - vassal castle
Wesenberg (Rakvere, Estonia) - a genuine order castle, seat of a bailiff
Windau (Ventspils, Latvia) - a genuine order castle, seat of a commander
Wolkenburg (Volkenberga, Latvia)
Wolmar (Valmiera, Latvia)
Zlotterie (Złotoria, Poland)

See also
List of castles in Estonia
List of castles in Latvia
List of castles in Lithuania
List of castles in Poland

References